Newmarket railway station is located on the Ferny Grove line in Queensland, Australia. It serves the Brisbane suburb of Newmarket.

Services
Newmarket station is served by all stops Ferny Grove line services from Ferny Grove to Roma Street, Park Road, Coopers Plains and Beenleigh.

Services by platform

References

External links

Newmarket station Queensland Rail
Newmarket station Queensland's Railways on the Internet
[ Newmarket station] TransLink travel information

Newmarket, Queensland
Railway stations in Brisbane